Events in the year 1870 in Norway.

Incumbents
Monarch: Charles IV

Events

Arts and literature

Births

23 January – Ole Sæther, Olympic rifle shooter (died 1946)
17 April – Haaken Hasberg Gran, botanist (died 1955)
19 May – Nils Nilsen Ronning, Norwegian-American author and editor (died 1962)
14 September – Einar Borch, landowner and politician (died 1952).
22 October – Johan Ludwig Mowinckel, three-times Prime Minister of Norway (died 1943)
26 November – Elise Sem, barrister (died 1950)
29 November – Eivind Heiberg, engineer and railway director (died 1939)
7 December – Worm Hirsch Darre-Jenssen, engineer and politician (died 1945)

Full date unknown
Theodor Bull, businessperson and genealogist (died 1958)
Helmer Hanssen, polar explorer (died 1956)
Severin Andreas Heyerdahl, physician (died 1940)
Ivar Lykke Falch Lind, jurist and politician
Christian Pierre Mathiesen, politician and Minister (died 1953)
Birger Stuevold-Hansen, politician and Minister (died 1933)
Jens Thiis, art historian, conservator and museum director (died 1942)

Deaths
9 January – Ole Gabriel Gabrielsen Ueland, politician (born 1799)
30 July – Aasmund Olavsson Vinje, poet, journalist and writer (born 1818).
4 November – Otto Vincent Lange, politician and Minister (born 1797)
5 December – Herman Severin Løvenskiold, composer (born 1815)

See also

References